Zavadka is a small village (selo) in Stryi Raion, Lviv Oblast, of Western Ukraine. It belongs to Kozova rural hromada, one of the hromadas of Ukraine.
The population of village is just about 648 persons and local government is administered by Zavadkivska village council.

Geography 
The village is located in the mountains, that is far from the central road.
It is in the Ukrainian Carpathians within the limits of the Eastern Beskids on the northern slopes of the ridge Dovzhky.
The village is small and has an area of 2,46 km2.

History and attractions 
The village was founded in 1538 and was known as Ilnychok.

Until 18 July 2020, Zavadka belonged to Skole Raion. The raion was abolished in July 2020 as part of the administrative reform of Ukraine, which reduced the number of raions of Lviv Oblast to seven. The area of Skole Raion was merged into Stryi Raion.

The village has an architectural monument of local importance of Stryi Raion – the Cathedral Church of the Blessed Virgin Mary 1887 (wooden) – 2914-M.

References

External links 
 village Zavadka
 weather.in.ua
 Дерев'яні церкви Львівської області, Сколівський Район, Завадка Св. Арх. Михайла 1901 (сьогодні Преображення Господнього)

Literature 
 Історія міст і сіл УРСР : Львівська область, Завадка. – К. : ГРУРЕ, 1968 р. Page 716 

Villages in Stryi Raion